The Commemorative Cross of the 1916–1918 War is a Romanian First World War campaign medal established on 8 July 1918 by Royal Decree. The Decree was amended four times, in 1919, 1920, 1927 and 1939.

Eligibility
To qualify for the Commemorative Cross, recipients, civilians or military personnel of any rank, had to be mobilised for war service on any campaign between 1916 and 1918. This was later extended to 1919, thus being included the combatants from the Hungarian–Romanian War as well.

It was awarded for a lifetime, but it could have been lost if the recipient would have lost his Romanian citizenship, or would have suffered a penal sentence.

While initially the medal was to be used only by the recipient, in 1939 King Carol II of Romania authorised, for superior ranks only, the inheritance of the medal by the eldest son or older brother of the deceased recipient, who would become an active army officer. The inherited medal would receive a new clasp, inscribed Tradiție (tradition), and would have to be confirmed by royal decree

Description

The dark iron cross has a diameter of 40 mm. Each rhombic arm measures 10 mm on the exterior and 7 mm on the interior. In the center of the cross, there is a 13 mm circle. The external borders of the cross and the circle have 1.3 mm. Inside the circle, on the obverse, there is the royal cypher of King Ferdinand I of Romania (two Fs facing away with a royal crown on top), while on the reverse there is inscribed 1916|1918 on the early models and 1916|1919 on later models, in two rows.

The 30 mm ribbon alternates four equal bars of dark blue with three equal bars of green.

Clasps
Seventeen clasps were approved for the medal: eleven in the original Decree from 1918, three in 1919, one in 1920, one in 1927 and one in 1939. These clasps consist of small metal bars into which the name of the relevant campaign or theatre of operations was moulded (except for the last one). The clasps were then attached transversally to the medal's suspension bar.

 Ardeal
 Cerna
 Jiul - actually Jiu on existing clasps
 Carpați
 Oituz
 București
 Turtucaia
 
 Mărăști
 Mărășești
 Târgu-Ocna
 Dunărea
 1918
 1919
 Siberia
 Italia
 Tradiție

Usage and hierarchy

The medal was displayed on official occasions and ceremonies on the left breast of the jacket. On other occasions, it was customary to display only the ribbon bar, pinned on the left buttonhole. In the hierarchy of the Romanian military and civil awards and decorations from the mid 1930s, the Commemorative Cross held the very low 32nd place. The customary hierarchy of the military decorations was (not including those from the Independence War):

 Order of Michael the Brave
 The Military Virtue
 The Aeronautical Virtue
 The Cross of Queen Marie
 The Sanitary Merit Cross
 Valour and Faith with swords
 The Country's Momentum
 The Commemorative Cross 1916-1918
 Victory Medal

See also
Victory Medal (Romania)

References

External links
Romanian Commemorative Cross of the 1916–1918 War at "Romanian Medals & Orders".

Military awards and decorations of Romania